Ojiya-chijimi is a Hemp that is woven mainly in Ojiya, Niigata in Japan. It is a fabric using Ramie (Ramie fabric). It was designated as an Important Intangible Cultural Property in 1955, and was registered as a Intangible cultural heritage along with Echigo-jofu in 2009.

References

See also 

 Echigo-jofu

Culture in Niigata Prefecture
Important Intangible Cultural Properties of Japan
Ojiya, Niigata
Hemp
Woven fabrics
Intangible Cultural Heritage of Humanity